Dawt Township is an inactive township in Ozark County, in the U.S. state of Missouri.

Dawt Township was established in 1908, taking its name from the community of Dawt, Missouri.

References

Townships in Missouri
Townships in Ozark County, Missouri